Coleophora gazella is a moth of the family Coleophoridae. It is found in Turkestan, Afghanistan and Turkey.

The larvae feed on the leaves of Artemisia turanica, including f. diffusa in stony desert. They create a silky, sheathlike case, with the end curved downward, oblique sinuous wrinkles and longitudinal grooves. The length of the case is 12–14 mm and the color of the fresh case is dull white. Larvae can be found from the end of May to the beginning of June and (after diapause) again from April to May. Larvae hibernate.

Subspecies
Coleophora gazella gazella
Coleophora gazella sinevi (Reznik, 1989)

References

gazella
Moths described in 1952
Moths of Asia